Pharodoris is a genus of sea slugs, a dorid nudibranch, a shell-less marine gastropod mollusc in the family Dorididae.

Species 
Species in the genus Pharodoris includes:

 Pharodoris diaphora Valdés, 2001 
 Pharodoris philippinensis Valdés, 2001

References

Dorididae